{{DISPLAYTITLE:C17H18F3N3O3}}
The molecular formula C17H18F3N3O3 (molar mass: 369.338 g/mol) may refer to:

 Fleroxacin
 RU-58841

Molecular formulas